American Methodist Episcopal Mission (AMEM; also known as Board of Foreign Missions of the Methodist Episcopal Church [MEFB]) was the missionary society of the Methodist Episcopal Church that was involved in sending workers to countries such as China during the late Qing dynasty.

Mission in China

In 1847, the American Methodist Episcopal Society (North) entered the field of China, and soon surpassed all others in the number of its agents and members. Its pioneer was Rev. Judson Dwight Collins, who passionately asked the society to enter China. When he was told that no money was available for the purpose, he wrote:

Such enthusiasm was irresistible, and Collins was sent to Fuzhou, where, after ten years weary preparation, a work broke out, which spread itself over six large districts, and comprised sixty stations. A printing press was kept busily employed, which, in the year 1888 alone, issued 14,000 pages of Christian literature. A large college was in use through the generosity of a natives. The mission also wound along the banks of the Yangtze for three hundred miles, and had stations in Jiujiang and other large cities. Northwards it has churches in Beijing, Tianjin and Isunhua, with full accompaniments of schools and hospitals, and it extended westward to Chongqing, 1,400 miles from the sea. In 1890 it had thirty-two missionaries, seventeen lady agents, forty-three native ordained pastors, ninety-one unordained native helpers, and over four thousand communicants.

See also
American Methodist Episcopal Mission in Sichuan
Canadian Methodist Mission
Christianity in China
List of Protestant missionaries in China
List of Protestant missionary societies in China (1807–1953)
Protestant missions in China 1807–1953
Timeline of Chinese history

Notes

References
 

Christian missionary societies
Christian missions in China
American Methodist Episcopal Mission
Methodist organizations
Religious organizations established in 1847
1847 establishments in China
Methodist missions
Methodist Episcopal Church